The first recording of Edward Elgar's Symphony No 1 was made by the London Symphony Orchestra in 1930, conducted by the composer for His Master's Voice (a label absorbed into the EMI recording group the following year). The recording was reissued on long-playing record (LP) in 1970, and on compact disc in 1992 as part of EMI's "Elgar Edition" of all the composer's electrical recordings of his works.

After 1931, the work had no further gramophone recordings until Sir Adrian Boult's 1950 recording (see below). During the 1950s there was only one other new recording of the symphony, and in the 1960s there were only two. In the 1970s there were four new recordings. In the 1980s there were six, and the 1990s saw twelve. Ten new recordings were released in the first decade of the 21st century.

Recordings by date

Critical opinion

BBC Radio 3's "Building a Library" feature, a comparative review of all available recordings, has considered the symphony three times since 1982, recommending as follows:

23 January 1982, reviewer, Andrew Keener:
London Philharmonic Orchestra, Sir Adrian Boult (1977) 
London Philharmonic Orchestra, Vernon Handley
23 April 1994, reviewer, Jerrold Northrop Moore: 
BBC Philharmonic, George Hurst  
London Symphony Orchestra, Sir Edward Elgar
17 March 2007, reviewer, David Owen Norris: 
Dresden Staatskapelle, Sir Colin Davis

The Penguin Guide to Recorded Classical Music, 2008 edition, awarded its maximum four star rating ("a really exceptional issue on every count") to Solti's LPO set (coupled with the Second Symphony) and Barbirolli's final 1970 recording (coupled with the Introduction and Allegro).  The Guide's three star rating ("an outstanding performance and recording") was given to both of the EMI recordings by Boult, and to Colin Davis (LSO Live), Hurst, Elder, and Handley.

References
March, Ivan (ed). The Penguin Guide to Recorded Classical Music, Penguin Books, London, 2007.

Notes

Symphony discographies
Symphony No. 1 discography